The Battle of Lopate took place in 1796 between Old Montenegro and the Ottoman Empire near Lopate. Using Mahmut-pasha Bushatli's attack on Montenegro (see Battle of Krusi), Ottoman forces from Nikšić, Kolašin, Bihor, Bijelo Polje, Gusinje; likewise from Foča, Gacko, Stolac, Blagaj, Nevesinje, Trebinje and Korjenići; began advancing to the Montenegrin border. In early October 1796, when the Battle of Krusi occurred, a unit was organized, consisting of the soldiers from the mentioned towns. This unit attacked the mountains of Morača (Mount Lopatice, near Lopate) against the tribespeople of Trebjesa, Morača and Rovci. The unit suffered noticeable casualties. According to available sources, both sides lost about forty people.

See also 
Battle of Martinići
Battle of Krusi

References 

Lopate
Lopeta
Lopate
Lopate
1796 in Europe
1796 in the Ottoman Empire
Prince-Bishopric of Montenegro
Lopate